Calthrop may refer to:
  (1878–1937),  English author, illustrator
 Donald Calthrop (1888–1940), English film actor 
 Everard Calthrop (1857–1927), British railway engineer and inventor
 Gladys Calthrop (1894–1980), British artist and set designer
 Guy Calthrop (1870–1919), British railway administrator and brother of Everard

See also 
 Caltrop, a weapon used against cavalry
 Calthorpe (disambiguation)
 Calthrop (weed), toxic weed

References